Animegao kigurumi is a type of masked cosplay that has its origins in the official stage shows of various Japanese anime but has also been adapted by hobbyists. In Japan, most performers refer to this kind of cosplay as 'kigurumi' instead of 'animegao' (アニメ顔, meaning "anime face"), which has been used overseas in order to differentiate the cosplay from the onesies sharing the same name. In the past, the term 'doller' had also been used for the performers, but it fell out of favor over the time and is mostly used in reference to the wearers of bjd-styled masks nowadays. Kigurumi is still a very minor part of the cosplay scene in Japan, though around 2005, it also began attracting attention overseas, including North America and Europe.

Practice of animegao kigurumi
As with other kinds of cosplay, many hobbyists have costumes of established characters from games or animations. The characters are usually female, and commonly human, although kigurumi characters of other races and genders do exist, including male (such as Kenshin Himura from Rurouni Kenshin), mechanical (such as Gundam Wing), elfin (such as Deedlit or Pirotess from Lodoss), and demonic (such as Inuyasha from the manga of the same name). Some kigurumi are original characters created by the performer. Both men and women wear kigurumi.

By wearing a body suit and mask, kigurumi cosplayers are able to closer resemble the characters with high accuracy, especially in the case of anime, anthro, or otherwise highly stylised characters. In kigurumi, the performers wear a plastic mask that was created by either molding or 3D printing and a matching flesh-coloured body suit (a zentai suit known as a hadatai). The body suit allows them less-detailed skin features, on the level of animated characters, and the mask allows a similar level of facial features.

Some hobbyists obtain masks from established hobbyist mask studios. As of 2018, there are six mask studios locations in Japan, as well as in Taiwan and the United States. Major production examples include a Japanese studio that takes orders for customized masks with wig and eye parts based on studio's original designs for over 130,000 yen (about US$1,182), and a Taiwanese studio that takes orders for fully customized masks for over 131,000 yen (about US$1,190).. The average price of a mask produced by a mask studio is between 100,000 and 200,000 yen (about between US$910 and US$1,819).

Media coverage
While kigurumi is largely used in stage shows and by hobbyists, it has extended into the acts of other performers. DJ Minami Momochi performs in such an outfit, American photographer Laurie Simmons featured them in a photo series, and Japanese fashion model Lulu Hashimoto incorporates them in her outfits. Kigurumi cafes have also operated in Japan, where waitresses are dressed in costume.

See also
 Kigurumi

References

Cosplay
Masks in Asia